John Seamus "Jack" McInerney (born August 5, 1992) is an American soccer player.

Career

Youth
Born in Chattanooga, Tennessee, McInerney moved with his family to Colorado, Illinois, California, and Florida before finally settling in Alpharetta, Georgia before he entered the third grade. He graduated from Bradenton Preparatory High School in Bradenton, Florida, and played club soccer for the Cobb Futbol Club in Georgia. He was named the National Soccer Coaches Association of America National Youth Player of the Year for 2009, having already established a regional reputation as a member of the Georgia 1992 Boys Olympic Development Program.

Professional
McInerney turned professional straight out of high school; he was drafted in the first round (7th overall) of the 2010 MLS SuperDraft by Philadelphia Union. He made his professional debut on March 25, in the opening game of the 2010 MLS season against Seattle Sounders FC. He scored his first professional goal on May 1 against the LA Galaxy.

McInerney also spent one match on loan with the Harrisburg City Islanders of the USL Second Division during the 2010 season.

In April 2014, McInerney was traded to the Montreal Impact in exchange for Andrew Wenger. During his first season with the Montreal Impact, McInerney grabbed his first professional silverware scoring three goals and winning the Canadian Championship golden boot as Montreal claimed the Canadian title.

McInerney scored the first goal in Montreal's 4–2 loss in the 2014–15 CONCACAF Champions League semi-final second leg.  However, because they won the opening leg at home 2–0, they advanced to the final on away goals. McInerney scored in the second leg of the final against Club América, however, Montreal lost the game 4–2 and 5–3 on aggregate.

In August 2015, McInerney was traded to the Columbus Crew SC in exchange for a 2nd round pick in the 2016 MLS SuperDraft after the Impact signed Didier Drogba. He ranks second in MLS history in goals scored by the age of 23 with 36.

Portland Timbers acquired McInerney from the Crew In January 2016 in exchange for targeted and general allocation money.

McInerney was acquired by LA Galaxy on April 18, 2017 after having been waived by Portland at the end of the 2016 season.

Indy Eleven announced on February 19, 2018 the signing of McInerney for the 2018 season.

On July 24, 2019, McInerney joined NISA expansion side Oakland Roots SC.

International
McInerney was a member of the U.S. Under 15 National Team during 2006 and 2007, and as a member of the U.S. Under-17 Team scored two goals in the 2009 FIFA U-17 World Cup. After scoring 10 goals in the first 14 matches of the 2013 Major League Soccer season, McInerney was named to the preliminary 35-man roster for the 2013 CONCACAF Gold Cup by Jürgen Klinsmann. McInerney was then named to the final 23-man roster for the tournament, giving him his first call-up to the senior side.

Career statistics

Honors

Montreal Impact
Canadian Championship (1): 2014 (also Tournament Golden Boot)

References

External links
 
 
 USSoccer.com Profile

1992 births
Living people
2013 CONCACAF Gold Cup players
American expatriate soccer players
American soccer players
Association football forwards
Columbus Crew players
CONCACAF Gold Cup-winning players
Expatriate soccer players in Canada
Indy Eleven players
LA Galaxy players
Major League Soccer All-Stars
Major League Soccer players
CF Montréal players
Penn FC players
People from Alpharetta, Georgia
Philadelphia Union draft picks
Philadelphia Union players
Portland Timbers players
Soccer players from Georgia (U.S. state)
Sportspeople from Chattanooga, Tennessee
Sportspeople from Fulton County, Georgia
United States men's under-20 international soccer players
United States men's under-23 international soccer players
United States men's youth international soccer players
USL Second Division players
National Independent Soccer Association players
Oakland Roots SC players